Pieter Antonie (Piet or Pieter) van Stuivenberg (10 January 1901 - 16 December 1988) was a Dutch artist, who was active as sculptor, painter, lithographer, and graphic artist.

Born in Schiedam, Van Stuivenberg received his art education at the  Academy of Fine Arts and Applied Sciences now Willem de Kooning Academy) in Rotterdam. From 1921 to 1927 he attended the evening art classes in sculpting.

Van Stuivenberg started his sculptor career as stonemason, and was first influenced by the expressionism and later abstract working with geometric shapes and tighter. In Rotterdam he jointed the art society R33, which was founded in 1933 and dismantled in 1941. He made study trips to Brussels, London and Paris. In the Netherlands he subsequently joined the artist group Vrije Beelden (Free Images), founded by the Rotterdam artists Koos van Vlijmen and Wout van Heusden and others in 1946. And he joined the group Creatie (Creation), in 1950 founded by Willy Boers en Ger Gerrits. In 1950 his work was represented at the fifth Salon des Réalités Nouvelles in Paris.

In 1967 Van Stuivenberg received the Hendrik Chabot Award, and in 1981 and 1994 a retrospective exhibition of his work was held by the Stedelijk Museum Schiedam. His work is in the collections of the Stedelijk Museum Amsterdam, Museum Boijmans Van Beuningen in Rotterdam and in the Stedelijk Museum Schiedam.

Work in public space 
 1950 Rotterdam : Zonder titel, Gedempte Zalmhaven (his first abstract sculpture in Rotterdam made for the Rotterdam Bouwcentrum)
 1957 Schiedam : Drie kinderen, Burg. van Harenlaan (De Hoeksteen)
 1965 Rotterdam : Zonder titel, an abstract marble plastic intended for Tench Square in Rotterdam-Hoogvliet 
 1968 Schiedam : Geborgenheid
 1970 Rotterdam : Dolle Jans droom (1969), Steiger
 1977 Schiedam : Moeder en kind, Grote Markt

References 

1901 births
1988 deaths
Dutch painters
Dutch male painters
Dutch sculptors
Dutch male sculptors
Willem de Kooning Academy alumni
People from Schiedam